The Manistee River Trail is an  linear hiking trail located in Michigan in Manistee County, along the east bank of the Manistee River between Red Bridge River Access and Seaton Creek Campground.

A  loop trail can be formed by two connector trails at the southern and northern termini connecting the Manistee River Trail to the North Country National Scenic Trail.  The loop trail can be accessed from the Marilla and Upper Branch Trailheads for the North Country National Scenic Trail and the Red Bridge and Seaton Creek accesses for the Manistee River Trail.

See also
North Country National Scenic Trail

External links
   Manistee River Trail USDA Forest Service Website

References

Hiking trails in Michigan
Protected areas of Manistee County, Michigan